Daniel Francis Jeroen van der Vat (28 October 1939 – 9 May 2019) was a journalist, writer and military historian, with a focus on naval history.

Born in Alkmaar, North Holland, Van der Vat grew up in the German-occupied Netherlands. He attended the Cardinal Vaughan Memorial School in London and then was a student at St Cuthbert's Society, Durham University, from 1957 to 1960, graduating with a BA in Classics.

He then became a graduate trainee on The Journal, a newspaper based in Newcastle-upon-Tyne, and later joined the Daily Mail in Manchester and returned to Newcastle as its regional chief reporter. He was recruited by The Sunday Times in 1965 and transferred to The Times in 1967. He was a foreign correspondent for ten years, opening The Times bureau in South Africa but was later expelled from the country after he had been described by the apartheid-era authorities as being a "pernicious liberal". Instead, he became the newspaper's bureau chief in Germany, but after Rupert Murdoch acquired The Times in 1981, he left and joined The Guardian the next year. He served as the publication's chief foreign leader-writer before he left the title in 1988 to write books. He continued to write obituaries for The Guardian.

Selected works
 (published as Gentlemen of War, The Amazing Story of Captain Karl von Müller and the SMS Emden in the US)

References

External links
Dan van der Vat papers at Senate House Library

1939 births
2019 deaths
Military historians
English male journalists
Vat, Dan van der
Vat, Dan van der
Historians of World War I
Historians of World War II
Vat, Dan van der
English naval historians
Alumni of St Cuthbert's Society, Durham